Ray "Pinky" Velazquez (born May 28, 1955) is a Latin-American sound producer, mixer, and remixer. Velazquez is the co-founder of Legends of Vinyl and is known for tracks including South Central, Disco Not Disco 2, Twilight 22, and Savage Lover. He was the A&R man and disco consultant for the Vanguard Records dance music department.

He was the club spinner for the Ipanema Discotheque in the 1970s. Velazquez was also a member of New York City's Rockpool and was the first DJ to win an award for programming progressive in alternative rock at WCCR AM RADIO of the City College New York, New York City.

Early life and career 
Ray was born in Arecibo, Puerto Rico and was raised in NY City. From 1979 to 1984 Velazquez was the A&R man and "Disco consultant" for Vanguard. In 1979 Ray was brought on board to help promote and scout for talent. Ray Pinky Velazquez was a popular Billboard magazine club spinner (disc Jockey) known for his tenure with the popular Brazilian nightclub the Ipanema Discotheque and also worked for the nightclub "Cartune Alley". He introduced and produced Spectrum City who later became Public Enemy. Their initial debut single "Lies" backed with "Check Out The Radio" highlighted "Check out the Radio" was a featured track in the 1992 Oliver Stone film titled "South Central". Ray founded and coordinated with Stevie Wonder protege producer Gordon Bahary as both Executive producer and mixer for Twilight 22. "Electric Kingdom"was the group's initial release on Vanguard records. The song peaked at #7 on US R&B Charts. Mr Velazquez mixed Fonda Rae and "Over Like A Fat Rat". The hit track reached #75 on the U,S r&b charts and #22 on the U.S. club charts. Carol Williams and "Cant Get Away (From your Love") reached #38 on the U.S. club charts and received significant  R&B radio play in the U.S. The hit track was mixed by Mr. Velazquez. During the 1980 's D.O.R ( dance oriented rock) invasion Ray "Pinky" started Flip Records, a division of the parent Vanguard records.

Discography

Remix

Production

Technical 

Sources:

References 

Living people
1955 births
20th-century American people
American audio engineers